Vedran Mesec (born 20 February 1988) is a Croatian footballer who plays as a forward for Austrian Landesliga side Union Peuerbach.

Career 
Mesec signed for Singapore Premier League side Balestier Khalsa ahead of the 2018 Singapore Premier League. Mesec made his debut for the Tigers in a 3–1 loss to Home United. Although often played as a midfielder, he notched a goal in his first six appearances.

References

External links

1988 births
Living people
Footballers from Zagreb
Association football forwards
Croatian footballers
NK Croatia Sesvete players
NK Maksimir players
NK Zelina players
HNK Segesta players
FC Etzella Ettelbruck players
NK Sesvete players
NK Aluminij players
Balestier Khalsa FC players
NK Lučko players
First Football League (Croatia) players
Luxembourg National Division players
Slovenian PrvaLiga players
Singapore Premier League players
Austrian 2. Landesliga players
Croatian expatriate footballers
Expatriate footballers in Luxembourg
Croatian expatriate sportspeople in Luxembourg
Expatriate footballers in Slovenia
Croatian expatriate sportspeople in Slovenia
Expatriate footballers in Singapore
Croatian expatriate sportspeople in Singapore
Expatriate footballers in Austria
Croatian expatriate sportspeople in Austria